Hiltons may refer to:

Hilton, New Jersey, also known as Hiltons
Hiltons, Virginia